In the mathematical theory of probability, Lenglart's inequality was proved by Èrik Lenglart in 1977. Later slight modifications are also called Lenglart's inequality.

Statement 

Let  be a non-negative  right-continuous -adapted process and let   be a non-negative right-continuous non-decreasing predictable process such that  for any bounded stopping time . Then
	
(i) 
	
(ii) .

Notes 

 1.See Théorème I and Corollaire II of

Bibliography 
 
 
 
 
 

Stochastic differential equations
Articles containing proofs
Probabilistic inequalities